Abigail Anna Van Twisk (born 1 March 1997) is a British professional racing cyclist, who most recently rode for UCI Women's WorldTeam . Prior to joining  in 2019, Van Twisk rode for the / team between 2015 and 2018. She competed in the road race at the 2018 Commonwealth Games in Gold Coast. She is coached by Tim Kennaugh. In September 2020,  announced that Van Twisk would go on maternity leave to give birth to her first child, due in February 2021.

See also
 List of 2016 UCI Women's Teams and riders

References

External links
 
 
 

1997 births
Living people
British female cyclists
People from Lambeth
Commonwealth Games competitors for England
Cyclists at the 2018 Commonwealth Games